The Men's 50 metre backstroke S1 swimming event at the 2004 Summer Paralympics was competed on 27 September. It was won by Christos Tampaxis, representing .

Final round

27 Sept. 2004, evening session

References

M